Arbós may refer to:

 Enrique Fernández Arbós (1863 –1939), a Spanish violinist
 Eduard Arbós (b. 1983), a Spanish field hockey player
 Juan Arbós (b. 1952), a Spanish field hockey player
 Jaime Arbós (b. 1952), a Spanish field hockey player

See also 
 ARBOS – Company for Music and Theatre
 Arbo (disambiguation)
 Arbos (disambiguation)